Camp Discovery is a therapedic summer camp located at Gainesboro, Tennessee (between Nashville and Knoxville) for Tennessee-area children and adults with disabilities such as muscular dystrophy, cancer, cerebral palsy, Down syndrome, as well as various developmental disabilities.

It has been in operation since 1983 and it was founded and still operated by the Tennessee Jaycee Foundation.

Background
In 1971, Arc of the United States asked the Jaycees to open a Foster Grandparent Program. Two years later, the ARC returned and asked to start another program for mentally disabled people, afterwards the Tennessee Jaycees Foundation was established in 1977 with John Germ as president. Less than a year later, a permanent camp site selection began for Camp Jaycee (renamed Camp Discovery in 1982 to avoid confusion). An application was made in 1980 and a lease was granted a year later to begin construction, then in 1983, the camp officially opens and the first 125 campers arrived. Many additions such as the dining hall, log cabins, and amphitheaters further enhanced the effectiveness of this camp.

References

External links
 Camp Discovery
 The Tennessee Jaycees

Discovery
Campgrounds in the United States
Discovery
Buildings and structures in Jackson County, Tennessee
1983 establishments in Tennessee